Proshino is a rural locality (a village) in Pelymskoye Rural Settlement, Kochyovsky District, Perm Krai, Russia. The population was 3 as of 2010. There are 3 streets.

Geography 
Proshino is located 16 km north of Kochyovo (the district's administrative centre) by road.

References 

Rural localities in Kochyovsky District